The Taichung Municipal City Huludun Cultural Center is a cultural center in Fengyuan District, Taichung, Taiwan.

Architecture
The center consists of art galleries and Weaving Craft Museum.

Transportation
The cultural center is accessible within walking distance east of Fengyuan Station of Taiwan Railways.

See also
 List of museums in Taiwan

References

External links
 

Cultural centers in Taichung